Tokioka (Japanese: 時岡) is a Japanese surname. It may refer to:
 Hiromasa Tokioka (born 1974), a former Japanese football player
 James Tokioka, an American politician and a Democratic member of the Hawaii House of Representatives since January 2007
Masayuki Tokioka (1897–1998), a Japanese businessman
 Takasi Tokioka (1913–2001), a Japanese zoologist specialist of marine animals

Japanese-language surnames